The Coup of 25 November 1975 (usually referred to as the  in Portugal) was a failed military coup d'état against the post-Carnation Revolution governing bodies of Portugal. This attempt was carried out by Portuguese far-left activists, who hoped to hijack the Portuguese transition to democracy in favor of a communist state.

Vasco Gonçalves, the previous Prime Minister (July 1974 to September 1975), later described the coup as a "provocation" organised by the sixth provisional government, saying that the government had ordered the paratroopers to bomb the occupied . These orders, carried out by low-level paratroopers, had subsequently led the paratroopers to invade air bases in an attempt to force the resignation of the Air Force chief of staff. Gonçalves blamed the Group of Nine and related elements.

Events
The political, economic, and social crisis in post-Carnation Revolution Portugal, a period known as PREC, and the make-up of The Constituent Assembly, the first democratically elected organ after the fall of the previous regime, gave rise to serious confrontations during what became known as the Hot Summer of 1975. This marked the start of the counter-revolutionary movement. This caused a division in the Armed Forces Movement which had been responsible for the overthrowing of the Estado Novo regime. It was the coup on 25 November 1975, followed by a counter-coup led by Ramalho Eanes, a pro-democracy moderate (and supported by moderate socialist Mário Soares), that re-established the democratic process.

25 of November
On this day, dissident paratroopers tried to seize military complexes across the country, in a coup attempt that was easily defeated by commandos loyal to the government. With the country engulfed in political chaos, some hundreds of military personnel sympathetic to the extreme left seized the Monsanto Air Base, the Air Force School, and five other air bases in the capital and in the south of Portugal.

See also 
 Carnation Revolution
 Portuguese transition to democracy
 Portuguese Third Republic
 23-F

References

Carnation Revolution
1975 in Portugal
Coup d'état attempts in Europe
Military coups in Portugal
Communist rebellions
1970s coups d'état and coup attempts
Conflicts in 1975